Pseudokamikiria klapperichi is a species of beetle in the family Cerambycidae, and the sole member of the genus Pseudokamikiria. It was described by Tippmann in 1955. It is known from China.

References

Apomecynini
Beetles described in 1955